The 2020 Upper Austria Ladies Linz was a  women's tennis tournament played on indoor hard courts. It was the 30th edition of the Linz Open, and part of the WTA International tournaments category of the 2020 WTA Tour. Originally scheduled from 19 to 25 October 2020 at the TipsArena Linz in Linz, Austria, it was rescheduled for 9 to 15 November 2020 due to the COVID-19 pandemic.

Points and prize money

Point distribution

Prize money

1 Qualifiers prize money is also the Round of 32 prize money
* per team

Singles entrants

Seeds 

 Rankings as of October 26, 2020

Other entrants 
The following players received wildcards into the singles main draw:
  Julia Grabher
  Barbara Haas
  Vera Zvonareva 

The following players received entry from the qualifying draw:
  Océane Dodin
  Jana Fett
  Anhelina Kalinina
  Tereza Martincová
  Harmony Tan
  Stefanie Vögele

The following player received entry as a lucky loser:
  Katarina Zavatska

Withdrawals
Before the tournament
  Anna Blinkova → replaced by  Aliaksandra Sasnovich
  Jennifer Brady  → replaced by  Jasmine Paolini
  Alizé Cornet   → replaced by   Varvara Gracheva
  Anett Kontaveit → replaced by  Marta Kostyuk
  Christina McHale → replaced by  Tamara Zidanšek
  Elena Rybakina → replaced by  Sorana Cîrstea
  Patricia Maria Țig  → replaced by  Viktória Kužmová
  Markéta Vondroušová → replaced by  Barbora Krejčíková
  Heather Watson → replaced by  Katarina Zavatska

Doubles entrants

Seeds 

1 Rankings as of October 26, 2020

Other entrants 
The following pairs received wildcards into the doubles main draw:
  Mira Antonitsch /  Julia Grabher
  Jodie Burrage /  Sabine Lisicki

Champions

Singles 

 Aryna Sabalenka def.  Elise Mertens, 7–5, 6–2.
This was Sabalenka's 8th WTA singles title, and third of the year.

Doubles 

 Arantxa Rus /  Tamara Zidanšek def.  Lucie Hradecká /  Kateřina Siniaková, 6–3, 6–4

References

External links 
 

2020 WTA Tour
2020
Upper Austria Ladies Linz
Upper Austria Ladies Linz
Linz
Generali